Petrophile plumosa is a species of flowering plant in the family Proteaceae and is endemic to southwestern Western Australia. It is a shrub with rigid, sharply-pointed, sometimes lobed leaves, and more or less spherical heads of hairy, pale yellow flowers.

Description

Taxonomy
Petrophile plumosa was first formally described in 1855 by Carl Meissner in Hooker's Journal of Botany and Kew Garden Miscellany from material collected by James Drummond. The specific epithet (plumosa) means "covered with feathers" referring to the hairy branchlets.

Distribution and habitat
This petrophile grows in shrubland in loamy soils over laterite on sandplain and gravelly hills in the Moore River area.

Conservation status
Petrophile plumosa is classified as "Priority Three" by the Government of Western Australia Department of Parks and Wildlife meaning that it is poorly known and known from only a few locations but is not under imminent threat.

References

plumosa
Eudicots of Western Australia
Endemic flora of Western Australia
Plants described in 1855
Taxa named by Carl Meissner